The Trees They Grow So High (also Early One Morning) is the debut album of English soprano Sarah Brightman. It consists of European folk songs with arrangements by Benjamin Britten and accompanying piano by Geoffrey Parsons.

Track listing

Chart performance

References

Sarah Brightman albums
1988 debut albums
EMI Records albums